Ráth Chairn (anglicised as Rathcairn) is a small village and Gaeltacht (Irish-speaking area) in County Meath, Ireland. It is about 55 km northwest of Dublin.  Ráth Chairn Gaeltacht was founded in 1935 when 41 families from Connemara were settled on land previously acquired by the Irish Land Commission. Each family was provided with a Land Commission house and a farm of approximately 8.9 hectares (22 acres), a sow, piglets and basic implements. A further 11 families joined the original settlers in 1935. In all, 443 people moved from Connemara to the Ráth Chairn area. 

In 1967 Ráth Chairn received official recognition as a Gaeltacht, following a local campaign. Today, it and the nearby village of Baile Ghib make up the Meath Gaeltacht. According to the 2016 census 16% of the population of Ráth Chairn and Baile Ghib speak Irish on a daily basis outside the education system.

A cooperative (the "Ráth Chairn Cooperation Society") was formed in 1973. Ráth Chairn has since grown into a village with a Catholic church, community hall for dramas, Comharchumann Ráth Chairn and RTÉ Raidió na Gaeltachta (also used by Coláiste na bhFiann during the summer months), sports facilities, an all-Irish primary and secondary school, a library and a pub (An Bradán Feasa). Several facilities in Ráth Chairn host children and adults wishing to learn Irish, and residential Irish language courses, Coláiste na bhFiann, are run for teenagers in the summer months.

Public transport 
Local Link route 188 provides a twice daily bus service linking the village to Athboy, Navan and Drogheda.

History

Campaign for Ráth Chairn 

The Ráth Chairn "colony" was a social experiment to redress the 17th-century ethnic cleansing of Ireland, having been moved there under Cromwell’s draconian action ‘To hell or Connaught’. The colonists were poor farmers largely from Connemara and Kerry, who were planted by the government in order to save the Irish language and traditions.

The resettlement 
In 1935, the first batch of families from the Connemara Gaeltacht moved east to Ráth Chairn to live on land acquired by the Land Commission. The initiative promised potential migrants a higher quality of life, greater crop yields than Connemara and newly built homes. The proposal also aimed to stop the decline of the Irish language by creating an Irish-speaking community in a new location.

For the most part, when the migrants arrived, they were welcomed into a county where the ethos of the romantic Gaelic revival was in full swing. However, resentment manifested itself in local newspapers, that the migrants were given the land in preference to the local farmers. The Meath Chronicle reported on April 27, 1935 that a local Meath resident was arrested for threatening the life of a Land Commission employee but was released without charge and secondhand accounts report that a migrant woman was harassed by gangs and told "to quit talking that gibberish here".

Notable people
Sibéal Ní Chasaide, sean-nós singer
Darach Ó Catháin, sean-nós singer
Bláthnaid Ní Chofaigh, television personality
Ciarán Ó Cofaigh, director and producer
Liam Mac Cóil, novelist, critic and essayist

References 

Articles on towns and villages in Ireland possibly missing Irish place names
Gaeltacht places in County Meath
Gaeltacht towns and villages
Intentional communities in Ireland
Planned communities in the Republic of Ireland
Towns and villages in County Meath